Palczewo  is a village in the administrative district of Gmina Ostaszewo, within Nowy Dwór Gdański County, Pomeranian Voivodeship, in northern Poland.

Before 1772 the area was part of Kingdom of Poland, 1772-1919 Prussia and Germany, 1920-1939 Free City of Danzig, 1939 - February 1945 Nazi Germany. For the history of the region, see History of Pomerania.

The village has a population of 331.

References

Palczewo